Cirio S.p.A. (Cirio Società per Azioni) is a major Italian food company.

It was founded in 1856 in Turin, Italy.
They also sponsored S.S.C. Napoli in 1982–83 and 1984–85 season and S.S. Lazio from 1996 to 2000.

See also

 List of Italian companies

External links
Official Web Site

References 

Food and drink companies of Italy
Companies based in Turin
Privately held companies of Italy
Food and drink companies established in 1856
Italian companies established in 1856
Italian brands